Indomitable may refer to:

Fauna
Indomitable melipotis or Melipotis indomita, a moth found in Central America

Literature
Early drafts of Herman Melville's novel Billy Budd had the ship HMS Bellipotent named as Indomitable
"Indomitable" (short story), a short story by Terry Brooks, published in Robert Silverberg's Legends II, which serves as an epilogue to The Wishsong of Shannara
Indomitable Spirit, a book authored by A. P. J. Abdul Kalam

Military
 USNS Indomitable (T-AGOS-7), U.S. Navy surveillance ship

Two warships of the Royal Navy have been named HMS Indomitable:
, the world's first battlecruiser, launched in 1907 and scrapped in 1922
, an aircraft carrier launched in 1940 and scrapped in 1955
The aircraft carrier , launched in 1980, was at one stage to be named HMS Indomitable

Sport
'The Indomitable Lions', the nickname of the Cameroon national football team

Other uses
 HMS Indomitable
 Indomitable (album)